Kalpana is a 1960 romantic Bollywood film starring Ashok Kumar, Padmini and Ragini. The music was composed by O. P. Nayyar. Lyrics were by Hasrat Jaipuri, Qamar Jalalabadi, Raja Mehdi Ali Khan & Jan Nisar Akhtar.

Plot
Widower Amar (Kumar) leads a middle-class lifestyle in Bombay along with his widowed mother and a daughter, Munni. His wife died soon after giving birth to Munni. Amar is the principal of Bharti Kala Kendra. When he goes for a vacation to Kashmir with his butler, D'Souza, he meets and falls in love with a woman named Kalpana (Padmini) and includes her in his painting. They meet several times and are drawn to each other. One day when Amar goes to propose, he finds out that they have left for an unknown destination. When he returns home by train he meets another young woman, Asha (Ragini), who he subsequently hires as the Kendra's dance teacher. He takes her home to meet his mother and Munni and both approve of her hoping that she will marry Amar. He watches Kalpana performing a dance item in the theatre, meets her and they rekindle their romance. Asha notices this and steps away, heartbroken. Amar asks Kalpana to go and meet his mother and Munni, which she does. During this meeting, they have an unexpected visitor, Johar, who is Kalpana's brother, and this is when the truth about Kalpana, her mother and their background surfaces, creating a furore in the lives of all of them. How things are sorted out makes up the latter part of the movie.

Cast
 Ashok Kumar as Amar
 Padmini as Kalpana
 Ragini as Asha 
 Achala Sachdev as Kishori Bai
 Sunder as D'Souza
 Baby Farida as Munni
 Iftekhar as Johar

Soundtrack

External links

1960s Hindi-language films
Films scored by O. P. Nayyar